The Band of the Castle Guards and the Police of the Czech Republic (Czech: Hudba Hradní stráže a Policie České republiky) is a unit of the Police of the Czech Republic responsible for providing musical support to the Prague Castle Guard of the Army of the Czech Republic, as well as during other official ceremonies at Prague Castle such as state visits.

The band's origins date to 1945 and it was officially organized within the Ministry of the Interior of Czechoslovakia in 1953. In 1990 it assumed the name "Band of the Castle Guards and the Police".

See also
 Law enforcement in the Czech Republic
 Police band

References

External links
 video of the Band of the Castle Guards performing during a Castle Guards drill (YouTube)

Law enforcement in the Czech Republic
Police bands
Prague Castle
Czech military bands